Vingtaine du Mont Cochon is one of the six vingtaines of the Parish of St. Helier, in the Channel Island of Jersey.
It is close to St Lawrence.

Elected Officials

National Elections
With the Vingtaine du Mont à l'Abbé and the Vingtaine de Haut du Mont au Prêtre, which forms District St Helier North the electors return four Deputies to the States of Jersey.

Municipal Elections
The Parish Assembly of St Helier elects one Vingtenier, three Constable's Officers and two Roads Inspectors to represent the vingtaine for a term of three years.

References 

Mont Cochon
Saint Helier